Arbetet (Swedish: The Labour) was a Swedish-language social democrat newspaper published in Malmö, Sweden, between 1887 and 2000.

History and profile
Arbetet was first published in Malmö on 6 August 1887. Axel Danielsson was the founder and served as the editor-in-chief between 1887 and 1889. The paper had a social democrat leaning and was officially affiliated with the Social Democratic Party.

The target audience of Arbetet was not only Malmö workers, but also economically middle-class. Bengt Lidforss was among the contributors of Arbetet. He published articles about natural sciences and political, philosophical and literary issues.

Frans Nilsson served as the editor-in-chief of Arbetet who assumed the post in 1961. From 1980 to 1990 Lars Engqvist was the editor-in-chief.

The paper awarded the Let Live Award (Swedish: Låt leva-priset). In 1981 the recipient of the award was Lech Walesa.

In the 1980s Arbetet enjoyed high levels of circulation and readership. In 1998 the paper sold 54,000 copies on weekdays and 58,000 copies on Sundays.

Arbetet ceased publication on 30 September 2000 soon after it went bankrupt in August 2000.

References

1887 establishments in Sweden
2000 disestablishments in Sweden
Daily newspapers published in Sweden
Defunct newspapers published in Sweden
Mass media in Malmö
Newspapers established in 1887
Publications disestablished in 2000
Socialist newspapers
Swedish-language newspapers
Swedish Social Democratic Party